The Hölters Institute (or Hölters Schule) is a school which integrates highschool, elementary school and kindergarten. It is located in the city of Villa Ballester, in Buenos Aires Province, Argentina.

It was established in 1931 by Hermann Hölters, a German educator, and, therefore, German is taught since kindergarten.

It was once recognized as a German school by the West German government.

See also

 German Argentine

References

External links
 Official Website

International schools in Greater Buenos Aires
Secondary schools in Argentina
Private schools in Argentina
1931 establishments in Argentina
Educational institutions established in 1931
Buenos Aires